Shalini S Sahuta is an Indian model and actress who is best known from her role Manu in the show “Trideviyaan” on SAB TV for which she was nominated for the best actress in ITA and GOLD AWARDS.

Shalini S Sahuta started her career at the age of 14 with numerous print ads and commercials like HDFC, ICICI, MAGGIE, AD GEL PENS etc.. She also starred in JAGIT SINGH’S LAST VIDEO “INTEHA”. She was also a radio jockey with BIG92.7FM and is also a voice over and dubbing artiste. She debuted in television as the lead of ”GupShup Coffee Shop“ on SAB TV. 

She is from Mumbai and holds a degree in information technology is also an entrepreneur who owns a salon “ALOHAA” in bandra west, Mumbai .

Filmography

Television

Films

References

External links
 

Living people
Year of birth missing (living people)
Place of birth missing (living people)
21st-century Indian actresses
Indian television actresses
Indian soap opera actresses
Actresses in Hindi television